Women's Health (WH), published by Hearst, is a lifestyle magazine centered on health, sex, nutrition, and fitness. It is published ten times a year in the United States and has a circulation of 1.5 million readers. The magazine has 13 international editions, circulates in over 25 countries, and reaches over 8 million readers globally. Before its acquisition by Hearst, it was founded by Rodale, Inc. in Emmaus, Pennsylvania.

The magazine features multiple sections, such as fitness, sex and love, food, weight loss, health, beauty, and style. Past Women’s Health cover models include Elisha Cuthbert, Ashley Greene, Anna Kournikova, Michelle Monaghan, Zoe Saldana and Elizabeth Banks.

History
Women's Health was created in 2005 by Rodale as a sister publication of Men's Health magazine. Bill Stump, a former Men’s Health editor, who was at the time the head of Rodale Inc.’s 'New Product Development department, led the launch. The magazine's founding editor-in-chief was Kristina Johnson, previously the original executive editor of Teen People. In 2008, David Zinczenko, editor-in-chief of Men's Health magazine, was named editorial director of Women's Health. In March 2009, Jack Essig, SVP/Publisher of Men's Health, was named SVP/Publisher of Women's Health.  

Women's Health is published in 14 countries: United States, Argentina, Australia, Brazil, Latin America, China, Germany, Indonesia, Malaysia, New Zealand, Philippines, Thailand, and Turkey. The German edition of the magazine was launched in April 2011. A South African version was launched alongside its own Men's Health magazine, which was issued a license for publication by Media24, with distribution by Magzter.

Rodale was acquired by Hearst in 2018.

Bauer Media Australia and New Zealand published women's Health's Australian edition. In July 2020, Bauer Media's Australia and New Zealand operations were acquired by the Sydney investment firm Mercury Capital, which put the magazine on a "pause" in the region due to "declining advertising revenue and travel restrictions caused by the COVID-19 pandemic."

The Polish edition, launched in 2013, ceased publication in 2023.

Health DVDs and books
The editors at Women's Health have worked together to produce DVDs marketed to aid in weight loss, toning, and physical conditioning. Some of their DVDs include Look, Better Naked, Ultimate Abs Workout, The Tone-up Workout, The Wedding Workout, and Train for Your Body Type.

The Women's Health editors have also published health and fitness books in conjunction with DVDs. Titles include The Women's Health Diet, The Big Book of Exercises, The Big Book of Abs, Look Better Naked, and Six Weeks to Skinny Jeans.

Awards and recognition
In 2012, Women's Health was ranked #4 on Adweek Media's "Hot List" and #2 on Advertising Age annual "A-List". Both recognize magazines for their performance in advertising and circulation. In March 2008, Women’s Health finished #1 on Adweek "10 under 50" Hot List. The magazine was named #2 on Advertising Age 2008 A List. In 2009, the magazine was named "Magazine of the Year" by Advertising Age. In 2011, Women's Health won a National Magazine Award for "General Excellence". The brand was named one of AdAge's "Magazines of the year" in both 2017 and 2018, and was nominated for a National Magazine Award for "magazine section" in 2016 and for "personal service" in 2017.

Editors-in-chief
Founding editor-in-chief, Kristina Johnson, guided Women's Health from its inception in 2003 until her departure in 2008. In January 2009, Michele Promalayko took over the title. She was succeeded in 2014 by Amy Keller Laird, the magazine's Executive Editor. On January 9, 2018, Hearst announced that Liz Plosser would take over.

References

External links

Women Health Issues

Fitness magazines
Health magazines
Lifestyle magazines published in the United States
Magazines established in 2005
Magazines published in New York City
Mercury Capital
Rodale, Inc.
Women's magazines published in the United States